Guilford is a regional rail station on the Northeast Corridor, located slightly south of the town center of Guilford, Connecticut. Owned by the Connecticut Department of Transportation, it is served by the CTrail Shore Line East service.

History

Service to Guilford was begun by the New Haven and New London Railroad in 1852. Most local service ended in the mid 20th century; however, Guilford was a stop on the final local train, the Clamdigger, until service was discontinued on January 28, 1972. The station building was demolished by Amtrak on February 23, 2000, due to concerns that the long-abandoned building might collapse. A derelict brick water tower and engine house–rare surviving examples of mid-19th-century railroad buildings–remain at the site.

The current station, with ADA-compliant high-level side platforms, opened on November 28, 2005, replacing the low-level platforms constructed in 1990 for the inauguration of Shore Line East service on May 29, 1990.

Ridership increases have rendered the parking lot at Guilford insufficient. 90 spaces were added on the Track 1 side of the Guilford station.

Guilford Center was not the only part of Guilford with a train station. Leete's Island station, located off Route 146 near the Branford line, served the Penn Central and later Amtrak Clamdigger service until 1972. Sachem's Head station, which was also located off Route 146 closer to Guilford Center, was closed in 1969.

Station layout
Guilford has two high-level side platforms, each two cars long. Before 10:00am, westbound trains use Track 4 and eastbound trains use Track 1. After 10:00 am, westbound trains use Track 1 and eastbound use Track 4. On weekends, this swap occurs around 1:00pm.

References

External links

Shore Line East - Guilford

Shore Line East stations
Former Amtrak stations in Connecticut
Stations on the Northeast Corridor
Buildings and structures in Guilford, Connecticut
Railroad stations in New Haven County, Connecticut
Former New York, New Haven and Hartford Railroad stations
Railway stations in the United States opened in 1990
Transportation in New Haven County, Connecticut